Sakhile Nyoni-Reiling is a Zimbabwean-born pilot living in Botswana. She was the first female pilot in Botswana and the first woman to serve as general manager of Air Botswana.

In 1988, Nyoni became the first female pilot in Botswana, working for Air Botswana. In 2011, she became the first woman to serve as general manager of Air Botswana.

References

20th-century Zimbabwean women
21st-century Zimbabwean women
Zimbabwean expatriates in Botswana
Botswana aviators
Women commercial aviators
Year of birth missing (living people)
Living people